Horda or Håra is a village in Ullensvang municipality in Vestland county, Norway. The village is located in a small valley off the northwestern shore of the lake Røldalsvatnet. It is the location of the Horda Tunnel, a spiral tunnel through which the European route E134 highway and Norwegian National Road 13 pass.

References

Villages in Vestland
Ullensvang